The System may refer to:

Literature
 The System, a book on chess by Hans Berliner
 The System, a comic book by Peter Kuper
 The System: The Glory and Scandal of Big-Time College Football, a 2013 book by Jeff Benedict and Armen Keteyian

Music
 The System, an American record label in partnership with Warner Music.
 The System (band), an American synth pop duo founded in 1982
 "The System", a song by punk band The Black Pacific
 El Sistema (Sp., "The System"), publicly financed music-education program originating in Venezuela

Film
 The System (1953 film), an American crime film
 The System (1964 film), a British film
 The System (2014 film), a Pakistani action/drama film
 The System (2022 film), an American action film

Sports
 The System (Gaelic football)
 The System, a strategy in basketball devised by Paul Westhead
 The System or Grinnell System, a fast-paced basketball strategy developed at Grinnell College
 Systema, a Russian martial art

Television
 The System, a 1996 BBC TV documentary series
 The System, a 2008 television special starring Derren Brown

Other uses
The System, a derogatory term for the Weimar Republic
The system may also refer to someone being placed in the database of prisons

See also
System (disambiguation)